This is a list of Belgian television related events from 1999.

Events
13 March - Vanessa Chinitor is selected to represent Belgium at the 1999 Eurovision Song Contest with her song "Like the Wind". She is selected to be the forty-second Belgian Eurovision entry during Eurosong held at the VRT Studios in Schelle.
Unknown - Willy Goossens wins the tenth season of VTM Soundmixshow, performing as Gilbert Bécaud.

Debuts

30 August - Wizzy & Woppy (1999-2007)

Television shows

1980s
VTM Soundmixshow (1989-1995, 1997-2000)

1990s
Samson en Gert (1990–present)
Familie (1991–present)
Wittekerke (1993-2008)
Thuis (1995–present)

Ending this year

Births

Deaths